Haval Khalil, (born 16 May 1995 in Husby, northern Stockholm) is a Swedish rapper. He was established in Skarpnäck within the municipality of Stockholm. He broke through with his debut album Inloggad in 2020, an album produced by Manny Flaco. Haval and Manny Flaco released a number of joint singles as Haval & Manny Flaco. The songs on the album receiving great viewing on streaming platform depict a difficult street  life with weapons and drugs.

In April 2021, Haval was nominated for a Swedish Grammy for the "Newcomer of the Year" category. The nomination caused controversy due to Haval's involvement in gangs and in a criminal case where charges had been  brought against him. Eventually, on 14 July 2021, Haval was convicted and sentenced for two and a half years for complicity in the kidnapping and robbery of rapper Einár. The trial was held in Södertörn District Court against various activities of the criminal gang Vårbynätverket.

Discography

Albums

Singles 
Solo

As Haval & Manny Flaco

Featured in

Other songs

References 

1995 births
Swedish rappers
Musicians from Stockholm
Living people
Swedish criminals